Elton William Gallegly (born March 7, 1944) is a former U.S. Representative from California. A Republican, he last represented . He previously represented the 23rd and 21st Districts, and served from 1987 to 2013. He did not seek re-election in 2012.

Gallegly is the longest-serving Congressional representative in Ventura County history.

Early life, education, and pre-congressional career
Born in Huntington Park, California on March 7, 1944, Gallegly attended California State University, Los Angeles but did not graduate. He worked as a real estate broker before entering politics. Gallegly is a former member of the Simi Valley, California City Council. He became Simi Valley's first elected mayor in 1982.

U.S. House of Representatives

Elections
In 1986, incumbent Republican U.S. Congresswoman Bobbi Fiedler decided to retire to run for the U.S. Senate. Gallegly won the primary with 50% of the vote. In the general election, he won with 68% of the vote. He won re-election in 1988 with 69% and in 1990 with 58%. In 1992, he defeated Democrat Anita Perez Ferguson 54%–41%. Since then, he won re-election with at least 58% of the vote, except in 2000. That year, he defeated Democrat Michael Case 54%–41%.

2006
On March 10, 2006, Gallegly announced his intent to retire from the House of Representatives after the 2006 mid-term elections, citing health concerns. He had already filed nomination papers to seek another term, however, and attempted to have his name removed from the Republican primary ballot. California election law, though, makes it clear that a candidate's name can only be withdrawn in the case of their death and, as a result, that Gallegly's name would have to remain on the ballot. The following week, after learning that he could not have his name removed from the ballot and that no new challengers would be allowed to enter the race, Gallegly changed his mind and decided to seek what he said would be his final term. He won re-election with 62% of the vote.

2008
Gallegly won re-election with 58% of the vote.

2010
Gallegly won re-election with 60% of the vote.

The top 5 groups or industries that have contributed cash to Representative Gallegly's  2009/2010 campaign are:
(1) Retirees:                     $39,484
(2) Real Estate:                  $35,578 
(3) Lawyers/Law Firms:            $29,374
(4) Pharmaceuticals:              $22,500, and
(5) Crop Production/Processing    $20,179.

Tenure
Gallegly's activism has focused on the issue of animal rights.  Gallegly himself wrote a bill, enacted in 1999, which made it a federal crime to sell videos of dogfights and other depictions of animal violence, which enabled people to profit from animal cruelty. However, on April 20, 2010, the Supreme Court of the United States, in an 8–1 ruling written by Chief Justice John Roberts, overturned Gallegly's law on the ground that the law violated the First Amendment right to freedom of speech, and created a "criminal prohibition of alarming breadth."

In his defense, Gallegly argued that the bill he wrote contained "exceptions for religious, political, scientific, educational, journalistic, and artistic expression [that] may have provided too many loopholes within the legislation. Bob Stevens was convicted of committing animal cruelty as defined by the law, but claimed that his rights to free speech and artistic expression protected him against prosecution." Representative Gallegly objected to Stevens’ defense, claiming that the videos "promote violence and, as such, are not protected by the Constitution.".

In 2011, Gallegly voted for the National Defense Authorization Act for Fiscal Year 2012.

Gallegly was a supporter of gifted and talented education, having introduced the Gifted and Talented Students Act of 1998 to provide funding for gifted education.

Committee assignments
 Committee on Foreign Affairs (Vice Chair)
 Subcommittee on Europe and Eurasia
 Subcommittee on the Western Hemisphere
 Committee on the Judiciary
 Subcommittee on Courts, Commercial and Administrative Law
 Subcommittee on Immigration Policy and Enforcement (Chairman)

Personal life
Gallegly is married to the former Janice Shrader and has four children. Gallegly is of partial Swiss descent.

A gallery has been named for him at the Ronald Reagan Presidential Library. The Elton and Janice Gallegly Center for Public Service and Civic Engagement at California Lutheran University is a non-partisan center named in honor of Congressman Gallegly.

Countrywide financial loan
In January 2012, it was reported that Gallegly received so-called "VIP" or "Friends of Angelo" loans from troubled mortgage lender Countrywide Financial, in which loans were granted at lower rates than were available to the public. Gallegly and names of other legislators were forwarded to the House Committee on Oversight and Government Reform, which begun an investigation into the issue. Gallegly denied knowing that he was part of Countrywide Financial's special loan program.

See also
 Gallegly amendment

References

External links
 
 

|-

1944 births
American people of Swiss descent
Living people
California city council members
California State University, Los Angeles alumni
Mayors of places in California
People from Simi Valley, California
Republican Party members of the United States House of Representatives from California
21st-century American politicians